Kresna Municipality is a municipality in Blagoevgrad Province in southwestern Bulgaria. The administrative center is the town of Kresna.

Towns and villages
The following towns and villages are located in Kresna Municipality:
 Kresna (Кресна)
 Dolna Gradeshnitsa (Долна Градешница)
 Ezerets (Езерец)
 Gorna Breznitsa (Горна Брезница)
 Oshtava (Ощава)
 Slivnitsa (Сливница)
 Stara Kresna (Стара Кресна)
 Vlahi (Влахи)

Religion
According to the latest Bulgarian census of 2011, the religious composition, among those who answered the optional question on religious identification, was the following:

See also
1904 Kresna earthquakes – Pair of earthquakes that devastated Kresna

References

External links

Municipalities in Blagoevgrad Province